Timelock is a science fiction film of 1996 directed by Robert Munic, starring Maryam d'Abo.

Outline
The film is set in another galaxy in the year 2251. Dangerous criminals from Earth are kept at Alpha 4, a penal colony on an asteroid, in cryonic suspension. There is chaos when the computer system is hit with a virus, and the men in storage wake up and gain control of the complex, led by McMasters (Jeff Speakman). He plans a break-out, hiring the co-pilot of the prison transport shuttle and planning to kill its captain, Jessie Teegs (Maryam d'Abo). However, she proves hard to kill and teams up with a petty thief and computer hacker, Riley (Arye Gross), who has been delivered to Alpha 4 by mistake, to fight McMasters for survival. After Wilson is killed in a random act of violence by one of the inmates, McMasters needs Teegs as a pilot and captures her, trying to force her to fly the ship out for him. There is a complication because the ship can't fly without a program stored on a disk which is missing.  However, Riley rescues Teegs, they find the disk, and escape with the shuttle, leaving the convicts with no way out.

Cast
Maryam d'Abo as Captain Jessie Teegs
Arye Gross as Riley
Jeffrey Meek as Williams
Ricco Ross as Tibock
Jeff Speakman as McMasters
Thomas G. Waites as Warden Andrews
Nicholas Worth as Sullivan
Joey Dedio as Larden
Martin Kove as Admiral Danny Teegs
Phillip Brock as Prisoner
Ira Heiden as Dr Teller
Shon Greenblatt as Snapper
Juan Pope (J. Lamont Pope) as Wilson
Tom Billett as Neville
Andrew James Jones as Ensign
Patrick Malone as Computer Tech
Cheryl Bartel as Clarissa
Jon Bascoe as Ali
Kyle Reed as Inmate 
Kirk Pynchon as Lieutenant
Roadblock Martin as Barber

Notes

External links
Timelock at IMDb 
Timelock (1996) at monstershack.net

American science fiction films